The Highway Traffic Act (HTA) (the Act) is legislation in Ontario, Canada, which regulates the licensing of vehicles, classification of traffic offences, administration of loads, classification of vehicles and other transport-related issues. First introduced in 1923 to deal with increasing accidents during the early years of motoring in Ontario, and replacing earlier legislation such as the Highway Travel Act, there have been amendments due to changes to driving conditions and new transportation trends. For example, in 2009, the Act was revised to ban the use of cell phones while driving.

Offences under the Highway Traffic Act are the most commonly tried in Provincial Offences court. Over 1.3 million offences are tried each year under the Act, with the most common charges being speeding (559,013 occurrences, s. 128 - Speeding), running a red light (127,836 occurrences, s. 144 - Red light - proceed before green), driving whilst disqualified (117,470 counts, s. 7 - Drive motor vehicle, no currently validated permit), fail to stop (51,263 counts, s. 136 - Disobey stop sign - fail to stop) and telephoning whilst driving (51,210 counts, s. 78.1 - Drive - hand-held communication device).

Sections 

Section 1 of the Act covers definitions and application of the Act to places other than highways. The definition of "highway" in the Act is broad in nature to include "a common and public highway, street, avenue, parkway, driveway, square, place, bridge, viaduct or trestle, any part of which is intended for or used by the general public for the passage of vehicles and includes the area between the lateral property lines thereof".

Part I: Administration 
Part I covers the following items in sections 2 to 5 of the Act:
 Powers and duties of the Ministry of Transportation
 Registrar of Motor Vehicles
 Deputy Registrar
 Forms
 Power to do things electronically
 Regulations re fees
 Administrative monetary penalties
 Cancellation of permit, license where false information is provided
 Cancellation of the permit, license where information on permit, the license is incorrect
 Protection from personal liability

Part II: Permits 
Part II covers the following items in sections 6 to 23 of the Act:

 Permit requirements
 International Registration Plan
 Record-keeping by IRP permit holders
 Examination and inspection
 Sharing examination, inspection findings with other IRP jurisdictions
 IRP inspector's costs
 Assessment and reassessment of fees, etc.
 Interest
 Objections
 Appeal or review from Minister's decision
 False statements on IRP documents
 Permit refusal or cancellation
 Collection and disclosure of information
 Assignment to another minister
 Disclosure to Minister of Finance re taxing statutes
 Regulations
 Fees
 Permit limitations
 False statement, change of name or address, obliterated vehicle no., etc.
 Manufacturer's vehicle information number to be affixed
 Where the transfer of ownership or end of lease
 Used vehicle information package
 Violations as to number plates
 Number plates, further violations
 Improper or invalid number plates and cab cards
 Exceptions as to residents of other provinces, permit requirements, etc.
 Commercial motor vehicles
 CVOR certificates issued, renewed by Registrar
 Revocation of CVOR certificate for dishonoured payments
 Refusal to issue, replace or new CVOR certificates
 Safety ratings, commercial motor vehicle operators
 Person deemed to be operator
 Commercial motor vehicles, enforcement of ss. 16-23, etc.
 Offences, commercial motor vehicles
 Regulations and fees, commercial motor vehicles
 Liability insurance for commercial motor vehicles
 Insurance

Part III: Parking Permits 
Part III covers the following items in sections 26 to 30 of the Act:
 Accessible parking permits
 Offence, accessible parking permit
 Inspection, accessible parking permit
 Regulations, accessible parking permits

Part IV: Licences 
Part IV covers the following items in sections 31 to 58 of the Act:

 Driving a privilege
 Driver's licence
 Combined photo card in lieu of driver's licence card
 Photo-comparison technology
 As to carrying licences and surrender on demand
 Exemption as to non-residents, licensing requirements
 Displaying licence that has been suspended, altered, etc.
 Driving prohibited while licence suspended
 Drivers under 16 prohibited
 Minimum age to drive motor-assisted, power-assisted bicycle
 Prohibition as to letting or hiring
 Picking up passengers for compensation prohibited without a licence, etc.
 Agreements with other jurisdictions
 Suspension on conviction for certain offences
 Suspension on: reinstatement, reduction, an extension of conviction
 Reinstatement conditions, ignition interlock devices
 Ignition interlock devices, further provisions
 Administrative vehicle impoundment for contravening ignition interlock condition
 Suspension for driving while disqualified
 Suspension while prohibited from driving
 Increased suspension time
 Condition on the licence that blood alcohol concentration level be zero
 When driver may be disqualified
 Defaulted fine
 Suspension and cancellation of licence, etc., general
 Notice, proposed action s. 47 or safety concern
 Administrative licence suspension for blood alcohol concentration above .05
 Short-term administrative licence suspension for drug or drug and alcohol impairment
 Breath testing, novice drivers
 Breath testing, driver accompanying novice
 Breath testing, young drivers
 Administrative suspension of licence for blood alcohol concentration above .08, failing or refusing to provide a breath sample
 Long-term administrative licence suspension for drug or drug and alcohol impairment
 Administrative vehicle impoundment for drug or drug and alcohol impairment, blood alcohol concentration above .08, failing to provide a sample or submit to tests
 Proceedings before Tribunal
 Appeal
 Appeal of ninety-day suspension
 Appeal of long-term vehicle impoundment for driving while suspended
 Appeal of impoundment, commercial motor vehicles
 Penalty for driving motor vehicle when permit suspended or cancelled
 Service of notice of licence suspension
 Driving while driver's licence suspended
 Where person whose permit or licence suspended does not hold permit or licence
 Suspension on appeal
 Long-term vehicle impoundment for driving while suspended
 Short-term vehicle impoundment for driving while suspended
 Demerit point system
 Conduct review programs
 Regulations, novice drivers
 Police request for novice driver's passenger's identification
 Offence, novice driver regulations
 Driving instructors
 Driving schools
 Inspectors

Part V: Garage and Storage Licences 
Part V covers the following items in sections 59 to 60:
 Licence respecting dealing in motor vehicles, etc.
 Second-hand vehicles, offences

Part VI: Equipment 
Part VI covers the following items in sections 61 to 107 of the Act:

 Lamps
 Vehicles with right-hand drive
 Brakes
 Hydraulic brake and system fluid
 Other equipment
 Extended mirrors
 Speedometers required in buses
 Speed-limiting systems
 Tires and wheels
 Regulations and offences, tires
 Rebuilt tires
 Safety glass
 Equipment obstructing the view
 Windows to afford clear view
 Noise, smoke, bells and horns
 Slow-moving vehicle sign
 Sleigh bells
 Display screen visible to driver prohibited
 Hand-held devices prohibited
 Speed measuring warning devices
 Pre-empting traffic control signal devices prohibited
 Attachments required when vehicle drew on highway
 Regulations re bumpers
 Inspections, unsafe vehicles
 Inspections, unsafe commercial motor vehicles
 Regulations re inspection of certain motor vehicles
 Penalty for driving an unsafe vehicle
 Offence if wheel detaches from commercial motor vehicle
 Offence if parts, etc., detach
 Offence of causing parts to detach
 Prohibition where evidence of inspection required
 Certificates and stickers provided by Ministry
 Regulations re inspection of vehicles
 Director
 Safety standards certificate and vehicle inspection sticker
 Motor vehicle inspection station licence
 Motor vehicle inspection mechanic
 Revocation of registration of motor vehicle inspection mechanic
 Hearing re terms of the licence
 Proposal to refuse to issue or revoke licence or registration
 Tribunal hearings, general
 Service of notice
 Inspectors
 Offences
 Regulations, safety standards certificates, motor vehicle inspection stations, etc.
 Regulations, accessories and ornaments
 Regulations, safety devices
 Commercial motor vehicles, further provisions
 Power-assisted bicycles
 Motorcycle and bicycle helmets
 Horse-riders, helmets and footwear
 Sale of new vehicles
 Seat belts
 Inspection and maintenance of commercial motor vehicles

Part VII: Load and Dimensions 
Part VII covers the following items in sections 108 to 113 of the Act:
 Vehicle dimensions
 Permits to exceed dimension and weight limits (use of highway)
 Special permits to exceed dimension and weight limits
 Carrying and production of a special permit
 Suspension, etc., of a special permit
 Additional power of Registrar to suspend, etc., special permits
 Loading vehicles
 Regulations, carriage of explosives, etc.
 Farm vehicles

Part VIII: Weight 
Part VIII covers the following items in sections 114 to 127 of the Act:
 Restrictions as to weight on tires
 Maximum allowable axle unit weights
 Maximum allowable axle group weights
 Maximum allowable gross vehicle weights
 Raw forest products allowance during freeze-up
 Prohibition re operation on Class B Highway
 Operating within permitted weight
 Reduced load periods
 Weight on bridges
 Power of officer to have vehicle weighed, examined
 Offence and penalty
 Overloading by consignor
 Regulations, weight standards

Part IX: Rate of Speed 
Part IX covers the following items in sections 128 to 132 of the Act:
 Rate of speed
 Status quo maintained
 Conversion of the rate of speed set out in by-laws
 Careless driving
 Territory without municipal organization
 Unnecessary slow driving prohibited

Part X: Rules of the Road 
Part X covers the following items in sections 133 to 191 of the Act:

 Direction of traffic by a police officer
 Removal of vehicle, debris blocking traffic
 Right of way at uncontrolled intersections
 Stop at through highway
 Stop signs, erection at intersections
 Yield right-of-way signs
 Right of way on entering highway from private road
 Pedestrian crossover
 Turning at intersections
 Signalling turns and stops
 Requirement to yield to bus from bus bay
 U-turns prohibited
 Traffic control signals and pedestrian control signals
 Blocking intersection
 Portable signal lights
 Traffic control stop and slow signs
 Slow vehicles to travel on right side
 Overtaking and passing rules
 Driving to left of centre prohibited under certain conditions
 Passing to right of the vehicle
 Highways designated for use of paved shoulder
 Meaning of "designated", ss. 141, 153 and 154
 Highway designated for one-way traffic
 Where highway divided into lanes
 Regulations for high occupancy vehicle lanes
 Restricted use of border approach lanes
 Times designation applicable
 Moving from roadway to roadway on divided highways
 Backing prohibited, speed limit over 80 km/h
 Headway
 Approaching, following emergency vehicles
 Towing of persons on bicycles, toboggans, etc., prohibited
 Only one vehicle to be drawn on highway
 Crowding driver's seat
 Vehicles required to stop at railway crossing signal
 Driving of vehicles under crossing gates prohibited
 Opening of doors of motor vehicles
 Passing streetcars
 Approaching ridden or driven horses, etc.
 Use of passing beam
 Alternating beams
 Parking on roadway
 Tow truck services
 Racing, stunts, etc., prohibited
 Nitrous oxide fuel systems prohibited
 Horse racing on a highway
 Railway crossings
 School buses
 School crossings
 Soliciting rides or business from drivers
 Clinging to vehicles, bicycle passengers, etc.
 Duties of a pedestrian when walking along a highway
 Littering highway prohibited
 Deposit of snow on the roadway
 Regulations, signs and markings
 Regulations, tunnels
 Defacing or removing notices or obstructions
 Regulating or prohibiting the use of highways by pedestrians, etc.
 Prohibiting commercial vehicles in the left lane
 Aircraft on highways
 Riding in the house or boat trailers prohibited
 Air cushioned vehicles prohibited on highways
 Commercial motor vehicles, driving rules
 Exemption certificate, hours of work for commercial motor vehicle drivers
 Contracts of carriage

Part X.1: Toll Highways 
Part X.1 covers the following items in section 191 of the Act:
 Toll device required
 Evasion, etc., of the electronic toll system
 Regulations, toll devices

Part X.2: Medical Transportation Services 
Part X.2 covers the following items in section 191 of the Act:
 Medical transportation services
 Regulations, medical transportation services

Part X.3: Off-Road Vehicles 
Part X.3 covers the following item in section 191 of the Act:
 Off-road vehicles on highways regulated by regulations, by-laws

Part XI: Civil Proceedings 
Part XI covers the following items in sections 191 to 193 of the Act:
 Liability for loss or damage
 Onus of disproving negligence

Part XII: Municipal By-Laws 
Part XII covers the following item in section 195 of the Act:
 Effect of by-laws7(1)(b)

Part XIII: Suspension for Failure to Pay Judgements or Meet Support Obligations 
Part XIII covers the following items in sections 196 to 198 of the Act:
 Licence suspended for failure to pay a judgement
 Licence suspension on the direction of Director of Family Responsibility Office
 Personal information
 Protection from personal liability

Part XIV: Records and Reporting of Accidents and Convictions 
Part XIV covers the following items in sections 199 to 205 of the Act:
 Duty to report an accident
 Irreparable vehicles, etc.
 Duty of person in charge of a vehicle in case of an accident
 Notification of damage to trees, fences, etc.
 Reporting by various officials
 Report of a medical practitioner
 Report of an optometrist
 Duties of Registrar
 Collection and disclosure of information

Part XIV.1: Photo-Radar System Evidence 
Part XIV.1 covers the following items in section 205 of the Act:

 Photo-radar system evidence
 Application, proceedings commenced by filing a certificate of offence
 Provincial Offences Act, Part I
 Evidence of ownership
 Service by mail
 Photographic equivalent
 Failure to respond
 Challenge to operator's evidence
 Challenge to officer's evidence
 Certificate evidence
 Failure to appear at trial
 Adjournment
 Reopening
 Regulations, photo-radar system evidence

Part XIV.2: Red Light Camera System Evidence 
Part XIV.2 covers the following items in section 205 of the Act:
 Red light camera system evidence
 Application, proceedings commenced by filing a certificate of offence
 Provincial Offences Act, Part I
 Evidence of ownership
 Deemed not to dispute a charge
 Challenge to officer's evidence
 Certificate evidence
 Failure to appear at trial
 Re-openings
 Limitations on penalty
 Regulations, red light camera system evidence

Part XV: Procedure, Arrests and Penalties 
Part XV covers the following items in sections 207 to 227 of the Act:

 Vehicle owner may be convicted
 Recovery
 Right to damages reserved
 Notice of conviction to Registrar
 Out-of-province evidence re vehicle ownership
 Return of suspended licences to Registrar
 Police officer may secure possession of a suspended licence
 When owner may appear before a justice of the peace
 General penalty
 Community safety zones
 Power of police officer to stop the vehicle
 Power of officer to examine commercial vehicles
 Arrest powers
 Cyclist to identify self
 Suspension of licence upon conviction
 Impounding motor vehicles
 Abandoned or unplated vehicles
 Impounding of the vehicle on appeal
 Appointment of officers for carrying out provisions of Act
 Service on the driver of commercial motor vehicle sufficient
 Inspection of records
 Where proceeding for the offence may be heard, commercial motor vehicles on a journey

Part XVI: Pilot Projects 
Part XVI covers the following items in section 228 and Schedule of the Act:
 Pilot projects
 Certificate of justice

Regulations 
The following Regulations are made under the Act:

 O. Reg. 398/16: Road-Building Machines
 O. Reg. 227/16: Pilot Project - Hot Lanes
 O. Reg. 194/16: Reporting to the Registrar: Administrative Suspension of Drivers' Licences
 O. Reg. 28/16: Pilot Project - Three-Wheeled Vehicles
 O. Reg. 419/15: Definitions of Commercial Motor Vehicle and Tow Truck
 O. Reg. 402/15: Pedestrian Crossover Signs
 O. Reg. 306/15: Pilot Project - Automated Vehicles
 O. Reg. 415/10: Short-Term Vehicle Impoundment under Section 55.2 of the Act
 O. Reg. 369/09: Power-Assisted Bicycles
 O. Reg. 366/09: Display Screens and Hand-Held Devices
 O. Reg. 287/08: Conduct Review Programs
 O. Reg. 484/07: Lamps - Use of Flashing Red or Green Lights
 O. Reg. 473/07: Licences for Driving Instructors and Driving Schools
 O. Reg. 455/07: Races, Contests and Stunts
 O. Reg. 273/07: Administrative Penalties
 O. Reg. 199/07: Commercial Motor Vehicle Inspections
 O. Reg. 555/06: Hours of Service
 O. Reg. 488/06: Pilot Project - Segways
 O. Reg. 94/06: Border Approach Lanes
 O. Reg. 34/06: Pre-Empting Traffic Control Signal Devices
 O. Reg. 643/05: Carriage of Goods
 O. Reg. 620/05: High Occupancy Vehicle Lanes
 O. Reg. 618/05: Designation of Bus By-Pass Shoulders on King's Highway
 O. Reg. 468/05: School Bus Offence - Service of Offence Notice on Vehicle Owner
 O. Reg. 413/05: Vehicle Weights and Dimensions - For Safe, Productive and Infrastructure-Friendly Vehicles
 O. Reg. 363/04: Security of Loads
 O. Reg. 11/04: International Registration Plan
 O. Reg. 316/03: Operation of Off-Road Vehicles on Highways
 O. Reg. 8/03: Local Municipalities where 80 Kilometres per Hour Speed Limit Applies
 O. Reg. 393/02: Definitions and Requirements under Section 142.1 of the Act (Yielding the Right of Way to Buses)
 O. Reg. 381/02: Testing, Repair and Compliance Requirements for Unsafe Vehicles under Section 82 of the Act
 O. Reg. 376/02: Classification of Vehicles as Irreparable, Salvage and Rebuilt
 O. Reg. 251/02: Ignition Interlock Devices
 O. Reg. 510/99: Community Safety Zones
 O. Reg. 277/99: Red Light Camera System Evidence
 O. Reg. 631/98: Long-Term Vehicle Impoundment under Section 55.1 of the Act
 O. Reg. 381/98: Special Permits
 O. Reg. 512/97: Critical Defects of Commercial Motor Vehicles
 O. Reg. 424/97: Commercial Motor Vehicle Operators' Information
 O. Reg. 147/97: Toll Devices
 O. Reg. 103/97: Standards to Determine Allowable Gross Vehicle Weight for Bridges
 O. Reg. 500/94: Photo-Radar System - Part XIV.1 of the Highway Traffic Act
 O. Reg. 341/94: Driver Licence Examinations
 O. Reg. 340/94: Drivers' Licences
 O. Reg. 339/94: Demerit Point System
 O. Reg. 601/93: Used Vehicle Information Package
 R.R.O. 1990, Reg. 631: Yield Right-of-Way Signs in Territory without Municipal Organization
 R.R.O. 1990, Reg: 630: Vehicles on Controlled-Access Highways
 R.R.O. 1990, Reg. 629: Accessible Vehicles
 R.R.O. 1990, Reg. 628: Vehicle Permits
 R.R.O. 1990, Reg. 627: Use of Controlled-Access Highways by Pedestrians
 R.R.O. 1990, Reg. 626: Traffic Control Signal Systems
 R.R.O. 1990, Reg. 625: Tire Standards and Specifications
 R.R.O. 1990, Reg. 624: Stop Signs in Territory without Municipal Organization
 R.R.O. 1990, Reg. 623: Stop Signs at intersections
 R.R.O. 1990, Reg. 622: Stopping of Vehicles on Parts of the King's Highway
 R.R.O. 1990, Reg. 621: Speed Limits in Territory without Municipal Organization
 R.R.O. 1990, Reg. 620: Speed Limits in Provincial Parks
 R.R.O. 1990, Reg. 619: Speed Limits
 R.R.O. 1990, Reg. 618: Specifications and Standards for Trailer Couplings
 R.R.O. 1990, Reg. 616: Slow Moving Vehicle Sign
 R.R.O. 1990, Reg. 615: Signs
 R.R.O. 1990, Reg. 613: Seat Belt Assemblies
 R.R.O. 1990, Reg. 612: School Buses
 R.R.O. 1990, Reg. 611: Safety Inspections
 R.R.O. 1990, Reg. 610: Safety Helmets
 R.R.O. 1990, Reg. 609: Restricted Use of the King's Highway and Toll Highways
 R.R.O. 1990, Reg. 608: Restricted Use of Left Lanes by Commercial Motor Vehicles
 R.R.O. 1990, Reg. 607: Reciprocal Suspension of Licences
 R.R.O. 1990, Reg. 606: Portable Lane Control Signal Systems
 R.R.O. 1990, Reg. 605: Parking of Vehicles in Territory without Municipal Organization
 R.R.O. 1990, Reg. 604: Parking
 R.R.O. 1990, Reg. 603: Over-Dimensional Farm Vehicles
 R.R.O. 1990, Reg. 601: Motor Vehicle Inspection Stations
 R.R.O. 1990, Reg. 599: Highway Closings
 R.R.O. 1990, Reg. 598: Gross Weight on Bridges
 R.R.O. 1990, Reg. 596: General
 R.R.O. 1990, Reg. 595: Garage Licences
 R.R.O. 1990, Reg. 587: Equipment
 R.R.O. 1990, Reg. 581: Accessible Parking for Persons with Disabilities
 R.R.O. 1990, Reg. 579: Designation of Highways
 R.R.O. 1990, Reg. 577: Covering of Loads

See also 

 Revised Statutes of Ontario

References

External links
 Highway Traffic Act
 Ontario Highway Traffic Act, unofficial discussion forum

Ontario provincial legislation
1923 in Canadian law
Rules of the road
Traffic law
1923 in Ontario